Wellfield School is a coeducational secondary school located in Wingate, County Durham, England.

It is a community school administered by Durham County Council.  Wellfield School offers GCSEs and BTECs as programmes of study for pupils.

History
The original school was opened by Councillor Peter Lee JP on Saturday 22 March 1930. The school was named The A.J Dawson Secondary School after the Director of Education who was well known in the area as he often visited schools. In subsequent years and reflecting changes to educational policy the school has been known as A.J Dawson Grammar School, Wellfield A. J Dawson Grammar School, Wellfield Comprehensive School, Wellfield Community School and now simply Wellfield School.

Wellfield Comprehensive School started as an amalgamation of three schools, Wellfield Grammar School (previously AJ Dawson), Wingate Secondary Modern School and Wheatley Hill Secondary Modern School. Then Yohden Hall School closed in the 1980s and pupils and staff from this school also joined Wellfield.

Wellfield has been judged as a “good” school by Ofsted in 2014 and 2018.

Wingate Secondary School Headteachers

A J Dawson Grammar School Headteachers

Wheatley Hill Secondary School Headteachers

Wellfield School Headteachers

References

External links

Secondary schools in County Durham
Community schools in County Durham
Educational institutions established in 1930
Wingate, County Durham
1930 establishments in England